Planulozoa is a clade which includes the Placozoa, Cnidaria (corals and jellyfish) and the Bilateria (all the more complex animals including worms, insects and vertebrates). The designation Planulozoa may be considered a synonym to Parahoxozoa. Within Planulozoa, the Placozoa may be a sister of Cnidaria to the exclusion of Bilateria. The clade excludes basal animals such as the Ctenophora (comb jellies),  and Porifera (sponges). Although this clade was sometimes used to specify a clade of Cnidaria and Bilateria to the exclusion of Placozoa (against the original intention of its proposal), this is no longer favoured due to recent data indicating a sister group relationship between Cnidaria and Placozoa.

The phylogenetic tree indicates approximately how many millions of years ago the lineages split. Here, Planulozoa is shown sans Placozoa.

Planulozoa are associated with the emerge of the Zoc and ZF-NC gene domains.

References 

Animal unranked clades